Chandraketugarh is a 2,500 years old archaeological site located near the Bidyadhari river,  about  north-east of Kolkata, India, in the district of North 24 parganas, near the township of Berachampa and the Harua Road railhead. Once it was an important hub of international maritime trade. A museum has been built near the site depicting largely collections of Dilip Kumar Maity, a retired school teacher and amateur archaeologist.

Asutosh Museum of Indian Art conducted excavation between 1957–68, which revealed relics of several historical periods, although the chronological classification of the relics remains incomplete. Many of the Chandraketugarh items and terracottas are now in collections of museums in India and abroad; and many of them are a part of private collections.

According to some historians, the Chandraketugarh site and surrounding area could be the place known to ancient Greek and Roman writers as having the same name as the river Ganges (Γάγγης).

According to the List of Monuments of National Importance in West Bengal (serial no. N-WB-1), Chandraketu's Fort is an ASI listed monument.

Location

Legend

The name of this site is derived from the mythical Hindu king of the medieval period, Chandraketu. A mound at the Berachampa village (Deuliya), off the Barasat-Basirhat Road, used to be called Chandraketur Garh (fort of Chandraketu), which was later compounded as Chandraketugarh. The legend of Khana (A medieval Bengali language poet and legendary astrologer between the ninth and 12th centuries AD, also named Lilavati elsewhere) centers around her association with Chandraketugarh (here, a mound has been discovered amongst ruins with the names of Khana and Mihir associated with it) and that she was the daughter-in-law of the famous astronomer and mathematician, Varāhamihira (505 – 587), also called Varaha or Mihira, a jewel among Chandragupta II Vikramaditya's famed Navaratna sabha.

It is widely believed that Khana was Varahamihira's daughter-in-law, and an accomplished astrologer, becoming thereby a potential threat to Varahamihira's scientific career. However, she exceeded him in the accuracy of her predictions, and at some point, either her husband (or father-in-law) or a hired hand (or possibly Khana herself under great duress) cut off her tongue to silence her prodigious talent.

There is another heritage mosque in the name of Pir Gorachand (an Arab missionary of 14th century named Syed Abbas Ali).

History
Chandraketugarh is thought to be a part of the ancient kingdom Gangaridai that was first described by Ptolemy in his famous work Geographica (150 CE). A recent archaeological study being conducted by a team from IIT Kharagpur, believes that King Sandrocottus (mentioned by Greek explorer Megasthenes) was Chandraketu, whose fort Chandraketugarh is. Megasthenes visited India in the third century BCE, after Alexander’s invasion of India, and gives a detailed account of what he saw in Indica. He mentions king Sandrocottus as one of the most powerful kings of Gangaridai, the Gangetic delta that spread over the five mouths of the river and was a continuum of a landmass comprising Anga, Banga and Kalinga. The history of Chandraketugarh dates back to almost the 3rd century BCE, during the pre-Mauryan era. Artefacts suggest that the site was continuously inhabited and flourished through the Shunga-Kushana period, onwards through the Gupta period and finally into the Pala-Sena period. Archaeological studies suggest that Chandraketugarh was an important town and a port city. It had a high encircling wall complete with a rampart and moat. The residents were involved in various crafts and mercantile activities. Although the religious inclinations of the people are unclear, hints of the beginning of some future cults can be seen in the artefacts. Some of the potteries carry inscriptions in Kharoshthi and Brahmi scripts.

After these periods, there was no such example of any other civilization on the ruin of Chandraketugarh.

Excavated archeological objects

Brahmi inscriptions with Megalithic Graffiti Symbols read "yojanani setuvandhat arddhasatah dvipa tamraparni", meaning "The island of Tamraparni (ancient Sri Lanka) is at a distance of 50 yojanas from Setuvandha (Rameswaram in Tamil Nadu). The mast of a ship with Vijayasinha's seal, describing Vijayasinha, the son of the king of Sinhapura of Vanga's marriage to Kuveni – the indigenous "Yakkha queen of Tamraparni". Chandraketugarh features many examples of terracotta art, displaying an unusual degree of precision and craftsmanship. These plaques are comparable to those found at other better-known sites such as Kaushambi and Ahichhatra. The terracotta plaques from these sites often carry similar motifs executed in nearly identical fashion. This similarity suggests an established communication link and common cultural heritage among these sites.

Finds include Northern Black Polished Ware (NBPW) relics, later wares dated from about 400 BC to 100 BC and approximately contemporary with the Maurya period, as well as from the more recent Kushanas and Gupta periods.

Many silver punch-marked coins and a few gold coins have been unearthed from Chandraketugarh, including a gold coin of Chandragupta-Kumardevi. Many semi-precious stone beads were also found here, along with items made of ivory and bone. Even a few wooden objects have survived.

See also

 Wari-Bateshwar ruins
 Shunga Empire
 Gangaridai
 Berachampa

References

Further reading
 Chandraketugarh : A Treasure House of Bengal Terracottas – Enamul Haque. Dhaka, The International Centre for Study of Bengal Art, 2001, 416 p., 678 illustrations including 400 in colour, figures, plates, maps, . 
 Chandraketugarh : A Lost Civilization – Gourishankar De and Shubhradip De. Kolkata, Sagnik Books, 2004, 109 p., 34 photos,

External links

 Banglapedia article
 Website concerning Chandraketugarh
 Chandraketugarh
 A plaque of Chandraketugarh
 A travel article on Chandraketugarh by Rangan Datta
 A Travel Article on Archeological Sites near Calcutta by Rangan Datta
 Rangan Datta's Home Page

Monuments of National Importance in West Bengal
Former populated places in India
Archaeological sites in West Bengal
North 24 Parganas district
Indo-Aryan archaeological sites